is a 6 episode series that was produced in Japan in 2005 and released on February 24, 2006. Each episode ran about 15 minutes, and took place in Akihabara, Tokyo - the cyber city of Japan. The story begins when a woman named Saki, an ex-bar girl,  tries to find a job to hide from a group of yakuza. She ends up getting a job at a Maid cafe called Meido no miyage (Maid's gift). She is the third maid to be joining the cafe. She was homeless and starts living in a 24-hour internet cafe.

Cast

Meido
 Mako - Saki Shinohara
 Risa Odagiri - Miyabi
 Mariko Fujita - Himeko

Others
 Kentaro Nakakura - 根岸肇
 Takeshi Yoshikoa - 前野貢
 Nakakura Kentaro - Hajime
 Yuuichi Koshimura - 銀角
 Andre - 金角

See also
 Cosplay restaurant
 Akihabara

External links
 Official website
 

2006 Japanese television series debuts
2006 Japanese television series endings
Akihabara
Japanese drama television series